Macphersonia is a genus of flowering plants belonging to the family Sapindaceae.

Its native range is Kenya to Mozambique, Western Indian Ocean.

Species:

Macphersonia cauliflora 
Macphersonia chapelieri 
Macphersonia gracilis 
Macphersonia macrocarpa 
Macphersonia madagascariensis 
Macphersonia radlkoferi

References

Sapindaceae
Sapindaceae genera